Pierz may refer to:

 Francis Xavier Pierz, Roman Catholic missionary to the Ottawa and Ojibwa Indians
 Pierz, Minnesota, a small city in the United States
 Pierz Township, Morrison County, Minnesota